Macedonia participated in the 2010 Summer Youth Olympics in Singapore.

The Macedonian squad consisted of 6 athletes competing in 4 sports: aquatics (swimming), archery, badminton, and tennis.

Badminton

Girls

Shooting

Pistol

Swimming

Tennis

Singles

Doubles

References

External links
Competitors List: Macedonia

Nations at the 2010 Summer Youth Olympics
2010 in Republic of Macedonia sport
North Macedonia at the Youth Olympics